"Ndoki" is a song recorded by Congolese singer Fally Ipupa, from his third studio album Power "Kosa Leka" (2013). Ipupa released the single on YouTube, on April 4, 2013. It is the second single by Fally Ipupa to be remixed by rapper Bigg masta G (Muana Mboka).

Conception and background
"Ndoki" was written and composed by Fally Ipupa and recorded and produced in France. The song's lyrics are about a woman who broke a man's heart by leaving him. He calls her "Ndoki" (Lingala for "Devil" or "Witch") for leaving him with heartache.

Ndonki eza kaka synonyme ya maseke na moto te  =  "Devil" is not only a synonym of having horns on ones head
Po na zamba ba niama mpe baza na yango na moto  =  Because some animals in the forest do have horns
Kasi ezali synonyme ya oyo azo lukela moninga liwa  =  But it is the synonym of someone who wants another to die
Ndoki ya vie na ngai eza yo, cherie  =  You are the devil of my life, sweetheart

"Ndoki" was included on Ipupa's third studio album Power "Kosa Leka" (2013), which was released on iTunes Store, YouTube and Google Play Music with no promotion having taken place.

Remixes

On May 11, 2014, rapper Bigg masta G (Muana Mboka), released the official remix of "Ndoki". In exactly the same way as he released the "Sweet Life" remix, Bigg masta G did not promote for it beforehand. Meje30, Poison Mobutu and Mami Wata released a second remix.

Personnel
Song credits

 Written by Fally Ipupa
 Fally Ipupa – vocals, production, vocal production

Remix 1 credits 
 Written by Fally Ipupa; Bigg masta G (Muana Mboka)
 Fally Ipupa – vocals, production, vocal production, instruments
 Bigg masta G;– additional production, additional vocals, remixing
 Bigg masta G;– recording, mixing, mastering

Remix 2 credits 
 Written by Fally Ipupa; Mami Wata; Meje 30; Poison Mobutu
 Mami Wata – – vocals
 Meje 30 – vocals
 Poison Mobutu – vocals

Video credits
Director –  Dandy

See also

Fally Ipupa
Bigg masta G (Muana Mboka)
Koffi Olomide
Ferre Gola
Mokobé
Lynnsha
Passi
Youssoupha

References

2013 singles
Fally Ipupa songs
2013 songs